Prairie du Sac is a town and village in Sauk County, Wisconsin:

 Prairie du Sac (town), Wisconsin
 Prairie du Sac (village), Wisconsin